Cacciatore means "hunter" in Italian. In cuisine, alla cacciatora refers to a meal prepared "hunter-style" with onions, herbs, usually tomatoes, often bell peppers, and sometimes wine.

Cacciatore is popularly made with braised chicken (pollo alla cacciatora) or rabbit (coniglio alla cacciatora). The  is a small salami that is seasoned with only garlic and pepper.

Preparation
A basic cacciatore recipe usually begins with a couple of tablespoons of olive oil heated in a large frying pan. Chicken parts, seasoned with salt and pepper, are seared in the oil for three to four minutes on each side. The chicken is removed from the pan, and most of the fat poured off. The remaining fat is used to fry the onions, peppers or other vegetables for several minutes. A small can of peeled tomatoes (drained of liquid and  chopped coarsely) is typically added to the pan along with rosemary and a half cup of dry red wine. Bay leaf may be used, along with chopped carrot to give extra sweetness. The seared chicken parts are returned to the pan which is then covered. The dish is done after about an hour at a very low simmer. Cacciatore is often served with a rustic bread. Outside of Italy (mainly in the US), it may be served with pasta on the side or atop white rice.

Chicken cacciatora
Chicken cacciatore typically, but not always, includes base ingredients of onion, garlic, and tomato.

Salami cacciatore

Salami Cacciatore typically originates from the southern Italian Provinces of Calabria, specifically Squillace.  Ingredients vary from region to region.

Variations
The many different variations of this dish are based upon ingredients available in specific regions. For example, in southern Italy, cacciatore often includes red wine, while northern Italian chefs might use white wine. Some versions of the dish may use mushrooms.

See also
 Chasseur
 Coq au vin
 Hunter's chicken
 Italian cuisine
 List of Italian dishes

References

Italian chicken dishes
Rabbit dishes